Dern is the surname of the following people:
Anne-Kathrin Dern (born 1987), German film composer 
Bruce Dern (born 1936), American actor 
Daisy Dern, American country music artist
Georg Dern (1901–?), German sports shooter
George Dern (1872–1936), American politician, mining man, and businessman
Harry Dern (1929–2009), Australian rules footballer
Laura Dern (born 1967), American actress, director, and producer 
Mackenzie Dern (born 1993), American mixed martial artist 
Nate Dern (born 1984), American writer and actor
Peggy Dern (1896–1966), American author